Isak may refer to:

 Isak (given name)
 Isak (surname)

See also
Izak (disambiguation)